Centradeniastrum is a genus of flowering plants belonging to the family Melastomataceae.

Its native range is Colombia, Peru and Ecuador.

Species:

Centradeniastrum album 
Centradeniastrum roseum

References

Melastomataceae
Melastomataceae genera
Taxa named by Alfred Cogniaux